Agnetha Chelimo (born 28 May 1974) is a Kenyan former racewalker. She was a four-time African champion in the discipline.

Career 

As a teenager she led the development of women's racewalking in Africa. At thirteen she was the gold medallist in the inaugural women's 5000 metres race walk at the 1987 All-Africa Games, ahead of two other Kenyan athletes. She returned four years later to claim the second title, finishing several seconds ahead of fellow Kenyan Grace Karimi and Algeria's Dounia Kara, who was to succeed her in 1995.

She was also a leading athlete in the development of the event at the African Championships in Athletics, winning the second and third editions of the 5000 m walk championship in 1989 and 1990.

She entered the 5000 m walk at the 1988 World Junior Championships in Athletics and placed thirteenth. Between 1986 and 1991 she won five Kenyan national titles in racewalking.

International competitions

National titles
Kenyan Athletics Championships
5000 m track walk: 1986, 1987, 1988
10,000 m track walk: 1989, 1991

References

External links
 
 

Living people
1974 births
Kenyan female racewalkers
African Games gold medalists for Kenya
African Games medalists in athletics (track and field)
Athletes (track and field) at the 1987 All-Africa Games
Athletes (track and field) at the 1991 All-Africa Games